Juan Moreira  is a 1973 Argentine dramatic historical film  directed by Leonardo Favio and starring Rodolfo Bebán. It is based on the homonymous novel by Eduardo Gutiérrez, which narrates the life of the famous Argentine outlaw, gaucho and folk hero Juan Moreira.

In a survey of the 100 greatest films of Argentine cinema carried out by the Museo del Cine Pablo Ducrós Hicken in 2000, the film reached the 9th position. In a new version of the survey organized in 2022 by the specialized magazines La vida útil, Taipei and La tierra quema, presented at the Mar del Plata International Film Festival, the film reached the 11th position.

Cast 
 Rodolfo Bebán ... Juan Moreira
 Jorge Villalba ... Julián Andrade
 Pablo Cumo ... Caudillo Acosta
 Osvaldo De la Vega
 Augusto Kretschmar ... Oficial
 Alba Mujica ... Death (The Grim Reaper)
 Carlos Muñoz ... Dr. Marañón
 Elcira Olivera Garcés ... La Vicenta
 Eduardo Rudy ... Lieutenant Major
 Edgardo Suárez ... El Cuerudo/Segundo, el compadre
 Elena Tritek ... Laura

References

External links 
 

1973 films
1970s historical films
Argentine historical films
1970s Spanish-language films
Argentine biographical films
Films set in the 19th century
Films based on Argentine novels
Films directed by Leonardo Favio
Films set in Argentina
1970s Argentine films